Eigil is a given name. Notable people with the given name include:

Eigil Axgil (1922–1995), Danish gay activist
Eigil Bryld, Danish cinematographer
Eigil Kragh Christiansen (1894–1943), Norwegian sailor
Eigil Gullvåg (1921–1991), Norwegian newspaper editor and politician
Eigil Hansen (1922–1991), Danish field hockey player
Eigil Helland-Hansen (1910–1997), Norwegian travel agent
Eigil Johansen (1915-?), Danish wrestler
Eigil Knuth (1903–1996), Danish explorer, archaeologist, sculptor and writer
Eigil Knutsen (born 1988), Norwegian politician
Eigil Olaf Liane (1916–1994), Norwegian politician
Eigil Nansen (1931-2017), Norwegian activist and torchbearer
Eigil Nielsen (footballer, born 1918) (1918–2000), Danish footballer
Eigil Nielsen (footballer, born 1948) (1948–2019), Danish footballer
Eigil Pedersen (1917–1994), Danish chess player
Eigil Ramsfjell (born 1955), Norwegian curler
Eigil Reimers (1904–1976), Danish actor
Eigil Sørensen (born 1948), Danish cyclist